The Swimming Federation of India (SFI) is the national governing body for aquatic sports in India. Legally, it is a non-profit association registered under the West Bengal Societies Registration Act, 1861. The federation holds elections for its office bearers every four years.  The SFI currently oversees competition in the sports of swimming, masters swimming, synchronized swimming, diving, high diving, and water polo. It is affiliated to FINA, and the Asia Swimming Federation (AASF).

The SFI was formed by the merger of the National Swimming Association (NSA) and the Indian Swimming Federation (ISF) in 1948. Prior to the merger, the NSA and ISF had been engaged in disputes. While the Calcutta-based NSA received affiliation from FINA in 1932-33, the ISF had the support of the Indian Olympic Association. The Union Government intervened to resolve the dispute by merging the two entities to form the SFI.

In July 2017, FINA presented a certificate to SFI CEO Virendra Nanavati during the 17th FINA World Championship in honour of his services to the discipline.

Total medals won by Indian Swimmers in Major tournaments

Total medals won by Indian Divers in Major tournaments

Total medals won by Indian Water Polo Team in Major tournaments

See also
List of Indian records in swimming
Water polo in India
India men's national water polo team
Arati Saha
Mihir Sen
Sachin Nag
Brojen Das
Shamsher Khan
Bula Choudhury
Virdhawal Khade
Srihari Nataraj
Sajan Prakash

Notes

References

Sports organizations established in 1948
1948 establishments in India
Swimming in India
Swimming
India
Organisations based in Ahmedabad